SS Cape Farewell (AK-5073) was laid down in 1973, as SS Delta Mar, a Maritime Administration type (C9-S-81d) hull under Maritime Administration contract (MA 259) at Avondale Industries Corp., New Orleans, LA.  She launched and delivered to the Maritime Administration for operation by Delta Line.  She was renamed SS American Mar and reacquired by the Maritime Administration for assignment to the Ready Reserve Fleet (RRF), 2 April 1987.  She is currently assigned to the Beaumont Reserve Fleet as part of the Maritime Administration Ready Reserve Fleet.  When activated Cape Farewell is assigned to Military Sealift Command (MSC) as one of four LASH Ready Reserve Force Ships. Cape Farewell can be activated in 10 days (ROS-10)

See also
SS Cape Flattery (AK-5070) sister ship

References 
 avsource.org, SS Cape Farewell (AK-5073)

External links 
 National Defense Reserve Fleet Inventory

 

Ships built in Bridge City, Louisiana
1973 ships